Chowdhury Abdullah Al-Mamun is a Bangladeshi police officer and the current Inspector General of Police (IGP) of Bangladesh Police since 30 September 2022. Previously he served as Director General of Rapid Action Battalion (RAB). He was made the DG of RAB in April 2020. Prior to join RAB, he was the chief of Criminal Investigation Department (CID).

Early life
Al-Mamun was born on 12 January 1964 in the village of Shreehail under Sullah Upazila in Sunamganj District.

Career 
Mamun joined Bangladesh Police as an assistant superintendent of police in 1989. Mamun was promoted to Additional IG grade-I on October 2021. During his service period he served as superintendent of Police in Nilphamari district, deputy commissioner in Dhaka Metropolitan Police and as Deputy Inspector General in Mymensingh and Dhaka Range and Police Headquarters. Mamun was scheduled to retire on Jan 11, 2022 but he get extension of his job until July, 2024 on contact basis.

U.S. sanctions 
On 10 December 2021, the U.S. Department of the Treasury added Al-Mamun to its Specially Designated Nationals (SDN) list over the Killing of Ekramul Haque under the Global Magnistsky Act. Individuals on the list have their assets blocked and U.S. persons are generally prohibited from dealing with them.

Personal life
Al-Mamun is married to Tayyaba Musarrat Jaha in his personal life. The couple has two sons and a daughter.

References

Living people
1964 births
People from Sunamganj District
Bangladeshi police officers
Rapid Action Battalion officers
Specially Designated Nationals and Blocked Persons List
People sanctioned under the Magnitsky Act
Criminal Investigation Department (Bangladesh) officers